Spovid općena is the name of the first Croatian language printed book from 1496. It was printed in the printing press of Senj, Croatia and its process was overseen by Blaž Baromić. It was published some thirteen years after the first Croatian printed book Missale Romanum Glagolitice, written in Old Church Slavonic. It contains 36 leaves, and is also the first Croatian non-liturgical incunabula. The book is a translation of "Confessione generale" (General Confessions) by the Milanese author Michele Carcano. The translation work was done by Jakov Blažiolović. The opening lines are "Počine spovidь opĉena ča est načinь ki ima držati č[lovi]kь naispita ñe konšencie kad se oĉe ispovid[a]ti".

See also
List of Glagolitic books

Footnotes

External links
Full scan of Spovid općena
Spovid općena on the British Library catalogue

Incunabula
1496 books
Croatian literature
Croatian glagolithic texts